The Dylan Thomas Screenplay Award is an annual prize administered by the Dylan Thomas Centre in Swansea. The prize was established in 2005 by the Swansea Bay Film Festival and is now in its fourth year. Results are announced at the festival's awards ceremony, and winners receive the festival's Tinny prize.

Sources 
https://withoutabox.com/03film/03t_fin/03t_fin_fest_01dead.php?festview=&category_id=207010

Dylan Thomas
Mass media and culture in Swansea